

PBA Bowling Tour: 2016 season
 February 25 – March 2: H.H. Emir Cup in  Doha
 Winner:  Danielle McEwan
 March 4 – 9: 14th Kingdom of Bahrain International Bowling Championships in  Manama
 Winner:  Ahmed Al-Awadhi
 March 13 – 20: Brunswick Euro Challenge in  Unterföhring
 Winner:  Jesper Svensson
 August 6 – 12: PBA–WBT Thailand in  Bangkok
 Winner:  Jesper Svensson
 November 1 – 8: UAE Open in  Abu Dhabi
 Canceled
 November 10 – 16: Kuwait Open in  Kuwait City
 Canceled
 November 18 – 23: 10th Kingdom International Open in  Riyadh
 Canceled
 December 10 – 16: Qatar Open 2016 in  Doha
 Winner:  Diana Zavjalova
 December: PBA World Championship (final) in  Reno
 Winner:  E. J. Tackett

European Bowling Tour 2016
 December 29, 2015 – January 10, 2016: Brunswick Ballmaster Open in  Helsinki
 Winner:  Parker Bohn III
 January 10 – 17: 28th Irish Open Championships in association with Storm in  Dublin
 Winner:  Tom Byrne
 January 31 – February 7: Hammer Bronzen Schietspoel Tournament 2016 in  Tilburg
 Winner:  Daniel Fransson
 February 17 – 21: 10th International Wroclaw Open in  Wrocław
 Winner:  Daniel Fransson
 March 12 – 20: Brunswick Euro Challenge in  Unterföhring
 Winner:  Jesper Svensson
 May 23 – 29: Kegel Aalborg International 2016 in  Aalborg
 Winner:  Peter Hellström
 May 29 – June 5: Odense International in  Odense
 Winner:  Richard Teece
 July 2 – 10: IV Brunswick Madrid Challenge in  Madrid
 Winner:  Ray Teece
 July 9 – 17: 12th Storm San Marino Open in  Serravalle
 Winner:  Dominic Barrett
 July 16 – 24: Track Dream-Bowl Palace Open by Erdinger in  Munich
 Winner:  Sin Li Jane
 July 25 – 31: Polish Open in  Wrocław
 Winner:  Richard Teece
 September 11 – 18: Chandra Open 2016 in  Nieuwegein
 Winner:  Ghislaine Stigter-van der Tol
 September 26 – October 2: 14th Columbia 300 Vienna Open in  Vienna
 Winner:  Jesper Svensson
 October 3 – 9: 1st Emax Open in  Munich
 Winner:  Richard Teece
 October 7 – 16: Norwegian Open 2016 by Brunswick in  Oslo
 Winner:  Jesper Svensson
 December 10 – 16: Qatar Bowling Open 2016 (final) in  Doha

Asian Bowling Tour 2016 
 April 8: ABF Tour - Thailand 2016 in  Bangkok
 Men's winner:  Sam Cooley
 Women's winner:  Sharon Koh
 June 27: ABF Tour – Macau 2016 in  Macau
 Men's winner:  Daisuke Yoshida
 Women's winner:  Lee Young Seung
 July 10: ABF Tour – Chinese Taipei 2016 in  Kaohsiung
 Men's winner:  Michael Mak
 Women's winner:  Hsu Chun-Yi
 July 18: ABF Tour – Hong Kong 2016 in  Hong Kong
 Men's winner:  Michael Mak
 Women's winner:  Han Kyeo Rae
 October 13: ABF Tour - China 2016 in  Shanghai
 Men's winner:  Mi Zhongli
 Women's winner:  Yang Liyan
 October 24: ABF Tour - Indonesia 2016 in  Jakarta
 Men's winner:  Remy Ong
 Women's winner:  Esther Cheah
 November 8 – 9: ABF Tour Tournament of Champions 2016 in 
 Canceled

Other in bowling
 March 19 – 28: European Youth Championships 2016 in  Reykjavik
 Boys' singles winner:  Patrik Sörensen
 Girls' singles winner:  Maria Bulanova
 Boys' all events winner:  Niko Oksanen
 Girls' all events winner:  Cajsa Wegner
 Boys' Masters winner:  William Svensson
 Girls' Masters winner:  Maria Bulanova
 Boys' doubles winners:  1 (William Svensson & Robert Lindberg)
 Girls' doubles winners:  2 (Bettina Burghard & Lea Degenhardt)
 Boys' team winners:  (Aleksander Kostric, Rok Kostric, Ziga Zalar, Tim Cerkvenik)
 Girls' team winners:  (Amanda Nyman, Alida Molander, Cajsa Wegner, Madelene Gullberg)
 April 3 – 10: CONCECABOL Senior and Super Senior in  Medellín

  won both the gold and overall medal tallies.
 April 22 – 26: PABCON Champion of Champions in  Mérida
 Men's winner:  François Lavoie
 Women's winner:  Rocio Restrepo
 May 22 – 28: 2016 WNBA Nine-Pin Bowling World Championships in  Novigrad
 Men's Single winner:  Vilmoš Zavarko
 Men's Sprint winner:  Vilmoš Zavarko
 Men's Combined winner:  Igor Kovačić
 Women's Single winner:  Ines Maričić
 Women's Sprint winner:  Beata Włodarczyk
 Women's Combined winner:  Ines Maričić
 Mixed Tandem winners:  (Luminiţa Viorica Dogaru & Nicolae Lupu)
 May 7 – 14: 2nd CONCECABOL Championship in  Mérida
 Winners:  Harvey Ramos (m) /  Jessica Sandoval (f)
 May 27 – June 2: 27th East Asian Tenpin Bowling Championship in  Tamuning
  win's overall gold and medal tally.
 June 8 – 19: European Women Championships 2016 in  Vienna
 Women's Singles winner:  Keira Reay
 Women's Doubles winners:  3 (Nina Flack & Joline Persson Planefors)
 Women's Trio winners:  1 (Birgit Pöppler, Tina Hulsch, Nadine Geißler)
 Women's Team winners: 
 June 25 – July 1: European Senior Bowling Championships 2016 in  Copenhagen
 Singles winners:  Michael Wittendorff (m) /  Martina Beckel (f)
 Doubles winners:  11 (Fred Larsson, Clas-Göran Henriksson) (m) /  1 (Miluše Nováková, Jana Lébrová) (f)
 Trios winners:  2 (Larry Exell, Kim Johnson, Paul Morris) (m) /  12 (Jaana Anttas, Tuula Tamminen, Helvi Nybakka) (f)
 All events winners:  Michael Wittendorff (m) /  Martina Beckel (f)
 July 24 – August 3: 2016 World Tenpin Bowling Youth Championships in  Lincoln, Nebraska
 Singles winners:  Wesley Low Jr. (m) /  Gazmine Mason (f)
 Doubles winners:  1 (Anthony Simonsen, Wesley Low Jr.) (m) /  1 (Lee Yeong-seung, Pak Yu-na) (f)
 Teams winners:  1 (Kamron Doyle, Wesley Low Jr., Anthony Simonsen, Michael Tang) (m) /  1 (Hong Sun-hwa, Kim Jin-ju, Lee Yeong-seung, Pak Yu-na) (f)
 All Event winners:  Pontus Andersson (m) /  Gazmine Mason (f)
 Masters winners:  Anthony Simonsen (m) /  Natasha Roslan (f)
 August 17 – 28: European Men Championship 2016 in  Wemmel
 Singles winner:  Jesper Agerbo
 Doubles winners:  3 (Joonas Jähi, Osku Palermaa)
 Trios winners:  1 (Glenn Morten Pedersen, Oyvin Kulseng, Tore Torgersen)
 Team winners:  (Peter Hellström, Martin Larsen, Jesper Svensson, Markus Jansson, Mattias Wetterberg, Pontus Andersson)
 All Event winner:  Jesper Agerbo
 August 21 – 28: Pabcon Senior & Super Senior Championship in  Santo Domingo
 Seniors winners:  Tony Santa (m) /  Veronica Berumen (f)
 Super Senior winners:  Bob Puttick (m) /  Nora Delgado
 September 10 – 24:Pabcon Championships (combined men and women) in  Cali
 Singles winners:  Sean Rash (m) /  Missy Parkin (f)
 Doubles winners:  (John Szczerbinski, AJ Chapman) (m) /  (Clara Guerrero, Rocio Restrepo) (f)
 Trios winners:  (Zach Wilkinis, Mitch Hupé, François Lavoie) (m) /  (Shannon Pluhowsky, Shannon O'Keefe, Josie Earnest) (f)
 Team winners:   (m) /  (f)
 All Event winners:  Zach Wilkinis (m) /  Clara Guerrero (f)
 Masters winners:  Marshall Kent (m) /  Shannon Pluhowsky (f)
 September 18 – 28:  24th Asian Tenpin Bowling Championships in  Hong Kong
  won both the gold.  overall medal tallies.
 October 14 – 23: QubicaAMF World Cup 2016 in  Shanghai
 Winners:  Wang Hongbo (m) /  Jenny Wegner
 October 24 – 31: European Champions Cup 2016 in  Olomouc
 Winners:  Jaroslav Lorenc (m) /  Cajsa Wegner
 October 25 – 31: 30th Asian Intercity Bowling Championships in  Jakarta
 Senior Men's Medal Tally:  Jakarta (m) /  Jakarta (f)
 Men's winners:  Daegu / Women's winners:  Singapore 
 Overall Medal Tally:  Singapore  
 November 19 – 27: Commonwealth Championships 2016 in  Johannesburg
 Winners:  Mohd Nur Aiman (m) /  Siti Amirah (f)
 November 20 – 30: 14th Asian Senior Bowling Championship in  Seoul
 Seniors Masters winners:  Jang Rang Hyun (m) /  Yumiko Yoshida (f)
 Grand Seniors Masters winners:  Masanobu Matsui (m) /  Junko Kuji (f)
 December 2 – 9: World Single Championships – men and women in  Doha

References

 
2016 in sports
Bowling